is a 2022 Spanish teen drama thriller limited television series created by Lucía Carballal and Juanma Ruiz de Córdoba for Atresplayer Premium based on the novel La edad de la ira by Nando López. The cast is led by Manu Ríos, also featuring Amaia Aberasturi, Daniel Ibáñez, Carlos Alcaide and Eloy Azorín.

Premise 
Following the brutal murder of a man, his son Marcos, a teenager very popular in his high-school, is identified as a possible killer. The plot deals with themes such as homophobia, identity formation, bullying, and violence against women.

Cast

Production 
The series is based on  novel , which is adapted by Lucía Carballal and Juanma Ruiz de Córdoba. Produced by Atresmedia Televisión in collaboration with Big Bang Media (The Mediapro Studio) and Masficción, shooting began on 30 August 2021. The project was presented by the cast members on 2 September 2021 at the FesTVal. The episodes were directed by Jesús Rodrigo and they were fully shot in Madrid (and the Madrid region), including the IES Ramiro de Maeztu.

Release 
The series premiered on Atresplayer Premium on 27 February 2022. The weekly broadcasting run wrapped with the release of the fourth and last episode on 20 March 2022.

References 

2020s Spanish drama television series
Spanish teen drama television series
Television series based on Spanish novels
Spanish-language television shows
Atresplayer Premium original programming
Spanish LGBT-related television shows
Television shows filmed in Spain
2022 Spanish television series debuts
2022 Spanish television series endings
Television series about teenagers
2020s LGBT-related drama television series